is a 1961 Japanese satirical comedy film by director Shōhei Imamura. The film depicts black market trades between the U.S. military and the local underworld at Yokosuka.

Plot 
The film focuses on Kinta, a member of the Himori Yakuza, who has been put in charge of the gang's pork distribution and his girlfriend Haruko, who works at a bar.  Kinta is shown working with other gangsters, beating up a local shopkeep who caters to Americans and paying the people who work on the hog farm.  When Kinta goes to visit Haruko in the afternoon she leaves without speaking to him and Kinta finds out through her sister that Haruko is being paid 30000 yen to go on a date with a sailor (and that her mother has already spent the money).  Haruko returns to Kinta later that night, although Kinta is unhappy because of the earlier events.  Haruko reveals that she is pregnant and expresses her concerns about Kinta’s work.

Another gangster calls on Kinta early in the morning and they go out on a small boat to a larger boat where the body of a man who ran afoul of the gangsters is loaded on for them to dispose of.  One of the other gangsters asks Kinta about being the fall guy, which Kinta reluctantly says he is willing to do.  Haruko gets an abortion, and the doctor charges Kinta extra knowing that the Yakuza have money.  A few days later, the body from the boat washes up on the wharf and is found by Kinta’s father.  Kinta and his boss hide the body before Kinta’s father returns with the police, but Kinta’s father notices that Kinta’s feet are dirty and figures out that Kinta hid the body, leading to a fight.  Haruko pushes Kinta to leave the gang and run away with her but Kinta refuses because he does not want to be a “wage slave”.

Meanwhile, one of the gangsters, Ohachi, is tasked with disposing of the body by burying it on the pig farm.  Kinta’s boss, Tetsuji, gets mad at the other gangsters when he finds out that they set Kinta up as the fall guy without consulting him, and it is revealed that the “big boss”, Himori, has some doubts about Tetsuji.  The boss calls for a celebration, where they drink, play games and cook one of the pigs.  As they are eating the pig Ohachi reveals that he was too lazy to bury the body so he simply boiled it and put it into the pig feed, disgusting the other gangsters.  Tetsuji, who is ill, becomes so sick that he has to go to the hospital.  Kinta finds out that his boss only has 3 days to live, information that Tetsuji forces out of him.  Tetsuji is distraught and pays a gangster named Wang to kill him at some point in the future.

Haruko, becoming increasingly frustrated with Kinta, goes to a party with sailors to get drunk.  Haruko is shown at a hotel with three Americans, all of whom are loud and drunk.  In a moment of clarity she tries to leave but is stopped and raped by the sailors.  Afterwards, Haruko attempts to escape with the American’s money but gets caught and goes to jail.  The next day, her family retrieves her and she agrees to become the mistress of the American according to her mother’s wishes.  Meanwhile, the Himori gang is crumbling for financial reasons.  Kinta and a few other gangsters agree to load the pigs on trucks that night and take the money for themselves.  Kinta goes to wait at the pig farm and finds Haruko, and the two agree to run away together after Kinta sells the pigs.  At night, Himori arrives before Kinta’s friends and loads up the pigs on trucks of his own, also beating up Kinta and loading him onto a truck.  Kinta’s friends arrive in time to see Himori leaving and follow them into the downtown.  Himori and Kinta's friends reach an agreement and decide once again to make Kinta the fall guy.  However, Kinta says no this time and uses a rifle he discovered earlier on the truck to ward off the other gangsters.  Tetsuji shows up, having discovered earlier that there was a medical mix-up and that he only has a mild ulcer, and Wang arrives, causing Tetsuji to run away, although he is in no danger because Wang discovered that he was paid in counterfeit money and would therefore not kill the boss.  Kinta orders the truck drivers to release all of the pigs.  Kinta is shot by one of the gangsters, and after Kinta returns fire, the terrified pigs stampede ultimately resulting in the deaths of the remaining Himori members.  Haruko, who had agreed to meet Kinta at the train station, overhears that there is Yakuza infighting downtown.  She rushes there only to find Kinta’s body, having died from his gunshot wound.  In the aftermath, days later, Haruko’s family is convinced that all things American will be of great benefit to her and, by extension, her family because she is vivacious and attractive. Her family helps her to prepare to leave with Gordon, the American military businessman. However, she has decided otherwise and sets off to see her uncle who has a job for her in Kawasaki. Her leave-taking is emotional and she cries. In the final scene, as she wipes the make-up and lipstick off her face and walks away over an open seashore, an American aircraft carrier arrives in the port and a busload of young Japanese women excitedly rushes off the bus and starts waving to the sailors coming onshore. She marches past them and boards her train out of town.

Cast
 Hiroyuki Nagato - Kinta
 Jitsuko Yoshimura - Haruko
 Masao Mishima - Himori
 Tetsurō Tamba - Slasher Tetsuji
 Shirō Ōsaka - Hoshino
 Takeshi Katō - Ohachi
 Shōichi Ozawa - Gunji, Gangster in check shirt
 Yōko Minamida - Katsuyo
 Hideo Sato - Kikuo
 Toshio Takahara - Doctor Miyaguchi
 Eijirō Tōno - Kan'ichi
 Akira Yamauchi - Sakiyama
 Sanae Nakahara - Hiromi
 Kin Sugai - Haruko's mother
 Bumon Kahara - Harukoma

Production
During the immediate post-war years, Imamura had been a black market hustler himself. Imamura conducted extensive research for the film, spending time with gangsters who he found to have a unique kind of pride and freedom. The gangsters teased Imamura for working hard but not having much money. Initially, Imamura wanted 1,500 pigs for the climax of the film, but had to make do with 400 due to financial constraints. Due to the controversial nature of Pigs and Battleships, and Imamura's overrunning production time and costs, Nikkatsu banned Imamura from directing for two years, during which time he wrote screenplays.

Reception and awards
Pigs and Battleships won the 1961 Blue Ribbon Award for Best Film.

In his 1986 review, Kevin Thomas of the Los Angeles Times described the plot as complex but with a simple message, a warning about cultural imperialism, and calls the climax hilarious and unique.
Also in 1986, Vincent Canby of The New York Times too praised the climax and described the movie overall as "refreshingly impolite". John Berra, writing for Electric Sheep Magazine, described the film as a "biting social satire" and "cruelly entertaining".

References

External links
 
 
 
 Pigs and Battleships: Feeding Frenzy an essay by Audie Bock at the Criterion Collection

1961 films
Japanese crime drama films
1961 crime drama films
Films directed by Shohei Imamura
Films set in Yokosuka
1960s Japanese-language films
Nikkatsu films
Japanese satirical films
1960s Japanese films